Rongchang Dongjie Station is a Subway station on the Yizhuang Line of the Beijing Subway. It opened on December 30, 2010, together with the other stations on the line.

As of 2020, it is an interchange station with the Line T1 of Yizhuang New Town Modern Tram.

Station Layout 
The station has 2 elevated side platforms.

Exits 
There are 2 exits, lettered A1 and B1. Exit A1 is accessible.

References

External links

Beijing Subway stations in Daxing District
Railway stations in China opened in 2010